Aeranthes ecalcarata is a species of orchid native to Madagascar.

References

ecalcarata
Orchids of Madagascar
Plants described in 1938
Least concern plants
Taxa named by Joseph Marie Henry Alfred Perrier de la Bâthie